Diophantus of Alexandria  (born ; died ) was a Greek mathematician, who was the author of a series of books called Arithmetica, many of which are now lost. His texts deal with solving algebraic equations. 

Diophantine equations,  Diophantine geometry, and Diophantine approximations are subareas of Number theory that are named after him. 

Diophantus coined the term παρισότης (parisotes) to refer to an approximate equality. This term was rendered as adaequalitas in Latin, and became the technique of adequality developed by Pierre de Fermat to find maxima for functions and tangent lines to curves.  

Diophantus was the first Greek mathematician who recognized positive rational numbers as numbers, by allowing fractions for coefficients and solutions. In modern use, Diophantine equations are algebraic equations with integer coefficients, for which integer solutions are sought.

Biography

Little is known about the life of Diophantus. He lived in Alexandria, Egypt, during the Roman era, probably from between AD 200 and 214 to 284 or 298. Diophantus has variously been described by historians as either Greek, or possibly Hellenized Egyptian, or Hellenized Babylonian, The last two of these identifications may stem from confusion with the 4th-century rhetorician Diophantus the Arab. Much of our knowledge of the life of Diophantus is derived from a 5th-century Greek anthology of number games and puzzles created by Metrodorus. One of the problems (sometimes called his epitaph) states:

'Here lies Diophantus,' the wonder behold.
Through art algebraic, the stone tells how old:
'God gave him his boyhood one-sixth of his life,
One twelfth more as youth while whiskers grew rife;
And then yet one-seventh ere marriage begun;
In five years there came a bouncing new son.
Alas, the dear child of master and sage
After attaining half the measure of his father's life chill fate took him. After consoling his fate by the science of numbers for four years, he ended his life.'

This puzzle implies that Diophantus' age  can be expressed as

which gives  a value of 84 years. However, the accuracy of the information cannot be confirmed.

In popular culture, this puzzle was the Puzzle No.142 in Professor Layton and Pandora's Box as one of the hardest solving puzzles in the game, which needed to be unlocked by solving other puzzles first.

Arithmetica

Arithmetica is the major work of Diophantus and the most prominent work on algebra in Greek mathematics. It is a collection of problems giving numerical solutions of both determinate and indeterminate equations. Of the original thirteen books of which Arithmetica consisted only six have survived, though there are some who believe that four Arabic books discovered in 1968 are also by Diophantus. Some Diophantine problems from Arithmetica have been found in Arabic sources.

It should be mentioned here that Diophantus never used general methods in his solutions. Hermann Hankel, renowned German mathematician made the following remark regarding Diophantus.

“Our author (Diophantos) not the slightest trace of a general, comprehensive method is discernible; each problem calls for some special method which refuses to work even for the most closely related problems.  For this reason it is difficult for the modern scholar to solve the 101st problem even after having studied 100 of Diophantos’s solutions”.

History
Like many other Greek mathematical treatises, Diophantus was forgotten in Western Europe during the Dark Ages, since the study of ancient Greek, and literacy in general, had greatly declined.  The portion of the Greek Arithmetica that survived, however, was, like all ancient Greek texts transmitted to the early modern world, copied by, and thus known to, medieval Byzantine scholars. Scholia on Diophantus by the Byzantine Greek scholar John Chortasmenos (1370–1437) are preserved together with a comprehensive commentary written by the earlier Greek scholar Maximos Planudes (1260 – 1305), who produced an edition of Diophantus within the library of the Chora Monastery in Byzantine Constantinople. In addition, some portion of the Arithmetica probably survived in the Arab tradition (see above). In 1463 German mathematician Regiomontanus wrote:

 “No one has yet translated from the Greek into Latin the thirteen books of Diophantus, in which the very flower of the whole of arithmetic lies hidden . . . .”

Arithmetica was first translated from Greek into Latin by Bombelli in 1570, but the translation was never published. However, Bombelli borrowed many of the problems for his own book Algebra. The editio princeps of Arithmetica was published in 1575 by Xylander. The Latin translation of Arithmetica by Bachet in 1621 became the first Latin edition that was widely available. Pierre de Fermat owned a copy, studied it, and made notes in the margins. A later 1895 latin translation by Paul Tannery was said to be an improvement by Thomas L. Heath who used it in the 1910 2nd edition of his English translation.

Margin-writing by Fermat and Chortasmenos

The 1621 edition of Arithmetica by Bachet gained fame after Pierre de Fermat wrote his famous "Last Theorem" in the margins of his copy:

I have a truly marvelous proof of this proposition which this margin is too narrow to contain.”

Fermat's proof was never found, and the problem of finding a proof for the theorem went unsolved for centuries. A proof was finally found in 1994 by Andrew Wiles after working on it for seven years.  It is believed that Fermat did not actually have the proof he claimed to have. Although the original copy in which Fermat wrote this is lost today, Fermat's son edited the next edition of Diophantus, published in 1670. Even though the text is otherwise inferior to the 1621 edition, Fermat's annotations—including the "Last Theorem"—were printed in this version.

Fermat was not the first mathematician so moved to write in his own marginal notes to Diophantus; the Byzantine scholar John Chortasmenos (1370–1437) had written "Thy soul, Diophantus, be with Satan because of the difficulty of your other theorems and particularly of the present theorem" next to the same problem.

Other works

Diophantus wrote several other books besides Arithmetica, but very few of them have survived.

The Porisms
Diophantus himself refers to a work which consists of a collection of lemmas called The Porisms (or Porismata), but this book is entirely lost.

Although The Porisms is lost, we know three lemmas contained there, since Diophantus refers to them in the Arithmetica.

.

Polygonal numbers and geometric elements
Diophantus is also known to have written on polygonal numbers, a topic of great interest to Pythagoras and Pythagoreans. Fragments of a book dealing with polygonal numbers are extant.

A book called Preliminaries to the Geometric Elements has been traditionally attributed to Hero of Alexandria. It has been studied recently by Wilbur Knorr, who suggested that the attribution to Hero is incorrect, and that the true author is Diophantus.

Influence

Diophantus' work has had a large influence in history. Editions of  Arithmetica exerted a profound influence on the development of algebra in Europe in the late sixteenth and through the 17th and 18th centuries.  Diophantus and his works also influenced Arab mathematics and were of great fame among Arab mathematicians. Diophantus' work created a foundation for work on algebra and in fact much of advanced mathematics is based on algebra. How much he affected India is a matter of debate.

Diophantus is often called “the father of algebra" because he contributed greatly to number theory, mathematical notation, and because Arithmetica contains the earliest known use of syncopated notation. However this is usually debated, because Al-Khwarizmi was also given the title as "the father of algebra", nevertheless both mathematicians were both responsible for paving the way for algebra today.

Diophantine analysis

Today, Diophantine analysis is the area of study where integer (whole-number) solutions are sought for equations, and Diophantine equations are polynomial equations with integer coefficients to which only integer solutions are sought. It is usually rather difficult to tell whether a given Diophantine equation is solvable. Most of the problems in Arithmetica lead to quadratic equations. Diophantus was always satisfied with a rational solution and did not require a whole number which means he accepted fractions as solutions to his problems. Diophantus considered negative or irrational square root solutions "useless", "meaningless", and even "absurd". One solution was all he looked for in a quadratic equation. There is no evidence that suggests Diophantus even realized that there could be two solutions to a quadratic equation. He also considered simultaneous quadratic equations.

Mathematical notation

Diophantus made important advances in mathematical notation, becoming the first person known to use algebraic notation and symbolism. Before him everyone wrote out equations completely. Diophantus introduced an algebraic symbolism that used an abridged notation for frequently occurring operations, and an abbreviation for the unknown and for the powers of the unknown. Mathematical historian Kurt Vogel states:
“The symbolism that Diophantus introduced for the first time, and undoubtedly devised himself, provided a short and readily comprehensible means of expressing an equation... Since an abbreviation is also employed for the word ‘equals’, Diophantus took a fundamental step from verbal algebra towards symbolic algebra.”
Although Diophantus made important advances in symbolism, he still lacked the necessary notation to express more general methods. This caused his work to be more concerned with particular problems rather than general situations. Some of the limitations of Diophantus' notation are that he only had notation for one unknown and, when problems involved more than a single unknown, Diophantus was reduced to expressing "first unknown", "second unknown", etc. in words. He also lacked a symbol for a general number . Where we would write , Diophantus has to resort to constructions like:  "... a sixfold number increased by twelve, which is divided by the difference by which the square of the number exceeds three". Algebra still had a long way to go before very general problems could be written down and solved succinctly.

See also
 Erdős–Diophantine graph
 Diophantus II.VIII
 Polynomial Diophantine equation

Notes

References
 Allard, A. "Les scolies aux arithmétiques de Diophante d'Alexandrie dans le Matritensis Bibl.Nat.4678 et les Vatican Gr.191 et 304" Byzantion 53. Brussels, 1983: 682–710.
Bachet de Méziriac, C.G. Diophanti Alexandrini Arithmeticorum libri sex et De numeris multangulis liber unus. Paris: Lutetiae, 1621.
Bashmakova, Izabella G. Diophantos. Arithmetica and the Book of Polygonal Numbers. Introduction and Commentary Translation by I.N. Veselovsky. Moscow: Nauka [in Russian]. 
Christianidis, J. "Maxime Planude sur le sens du terme diophantien "plasmatikon"", Historia Scientiarum, 6 (1996)37-41.
Christianidis, J. "Une interpretation byzantine de Diophante", Historia Mathematica, 25 (1998) 22–28.
Czwalina, Arthur. Arithmetik des Diophantos von Alexandria. Göttingen, 1952.
Heath, Sir Thomas, Diophantos of Alexandria: A Study in the History of Greek Algebra, Cambridge: Cambridge University Press, 1885, 1910.
Robinson, D. C. and Luke Hodgkin. History of Mathematics, King's College London, 2003.
Rashed, Roshdi. L’Art de l’Algèbre de Diophante. éd. arabe. Le Caire : Bibliothèque Nationale, 1975.
Rashed, Roshdi. Diophante. Les Arithmétiques. Volume III: Book IV; Volume IV: Books V–VII, app., index. Collection des Universités de France. Paris (Société d’Édition “Les Belles Lettres”), 1984.
Sesiano, Jacques. The Arabic text of Books IV to VII of Diophantus’ translation and commentary. Thesis. Providence: Brown University, 1975.
Sesiano, Jacques. Books IV to VII of Diophantus’ Arithmetica in the Arabic translation attributed to Qusṭā ibn Lūqā,  Heidelberg: Springer-Verlag, 1982. , .
Σταμάτης, Ευάγγελος Σ. Διοφάντου Αριθμητικά. Η άλγεβρα των αρχαίων Ελλήνων. Αρχαίον κείμενον – μετάφρασις – επεξηγήσεις. Αθήναι, Οργανισμός Εκδόσεως Διδακτικών Βιβλίων, 1963.
Tannery, P. L. Diophanti Alexandrini Opera omnia: cum Graecis commentariis, Lipsiae: In aedibus B.G. Teubneri, 1893-1895 (online: vol. 1, vol. 2)
Ver Eecke, P. Diophante d’Alexandrie: Les Six Livres Arithmétiques et le Livre des Nombres Polygones, Bruges: Desclée, De Brouwer, 1921.
Wertheim, G. Die Arithmetik und die Schrift über Polygonalzahlen des Diophantus von Alexandria. Übersetzt und mit Anmerkungen von G. Wertheim. Leipzig, 1890.

Further reading
Bashmakova, Izabella G. "Diophante et Fermat," Revue d'Histoire des Sciences 19 (1966), pp. 289-306
Bashmakova, Izabella G. Diophantus and Diophantine Equations. Moscow: Nauka 1972 [in Russian]. German translation: Diophant und diophantische Gleichungen. Birkhauser, Basel/ Stuttgart, 1974. English translation: Diophantus and Diophantine Equations. Translated by Abe Shenitzer with the editorial assistance of Hardy Grant and updated by Joseph Silverman. The Dolciani Mathematical Expositions, 20. Mathematical Association of America, Washington, DC. 1997.
Bashmakova, Izabella G. “Arithmetic of Algebraic Curves from Diophantus to Poincaré,” Historia Mathematica 8 (1981), 393–416. 
Bashmakova, Izabella G., Slavutin, E.I. History of Diophantine Analysis from Diophantus to Fermat. Moscow: Nauka 1984 [in Russian].

Rashed, Roshdi, Houzel, Christian. Les Arithmétiques de Diophante : Lecture historique et mathématique, Berlin, New York : Walter de Gruyter, 2013.
Rashed, Roshdi, Histoire de l’analyse diophantienne classique : D’Abū Kāmil à Fermat, Berlin, New York : Walter de Gruyter.

External links

 
 Diophantus's Riddle Diophantus' epitaph, by E. Weisstein
 Norbert Schappacher (2005). Diophantus of Alexandria : a Text and its History.
 Review of Sesiano's Diophantus Review of J. Sesiano, Books IV to VII of Diophantus' Arithmetica, by Jan P. Hogendijk
 Latin translation from 1575 by Wilhelm Xylander

3rd-century births
3rd-century deaths
3rd-century Greek people
3rd-century Egyptian people
Ancient Alexandrians
Diophantus of Alexandria
Ancient Greeks in Egypt
Ancient Egyptian mathematicians
Diophantus of Alexandria
3rd-century writers
3rd-century mathematicians